Notonomus tenuistriatus is a species of ground beetle in the subfamily Pterostichinae. It was described by Sloane in 1913.

References

Notonomus
Beetles described in 1913